Thomas Desvignes (1812 – 11 May 1868) was an English entomologist who specialised in Hymenoptera. He wrote (1856) Catalogue of British Ichneumonidae in the collection of the British Museum (London) and many scientific papers describing new species. Desvignes was a member of the Entomological Society of London from 1849. His collection of Ichneumonidae is in the Natural History Museum, London.

References
Anonym 1868: [Desvignes, T.]  Entomologist's Monthly Magazine (3) 5:25-26
Bates, H. W. 1868: [Desvignes, T.] Proc. Ent. Soc. London, London LVI
Newman 1868: [Desvignes, T.]  Entomologist 4: 108.

English entomologists
Hymenopterists
1812 births
1868 deaths